Events in the year 1677 in Norway.

Incumbents
Monarch: Christian V

Events
6–23 July - Battle of Marstrand.
August - Norwegian forces of 2,000 men, led by General Reinhold von Hoven and General Christian Shultz occupies Jemtland.
28 August - Battle of Uddevalla.
November - Sweden retakes Jemtland.
The construction of Staverns Fortress was finished.

Arts and literature

Births

Deaths

16 February – Robert Hamilton, governor and military officer (born around 1625).
12 September – Tønne Huitfeldt, landowner and military officer (born 1625).

See also

References